The Falls Bridge is a steel Pratt truss bridge that spans the Schuylkill River in Fairmount Park in Philadelphia, Pennsylvania. It connects Kelly (formerly East River) Drive at Calumet Street with Martin Luther King, Jr. (formerly West River) Drive at Neill Drive. It replaced a wooden covered bridge at the same site.

The  bridge, with stonemasonry abutments and two stonemasonry piers, with three Pratt-type pin-connected trusses, was built in 1894–1895 at a cost of $262,000 by Filbert Porter & Co. under the direction of Chief Engineer George Smedley Webster (1855–1931) of the Philadelphia Department of Public Works and James H. Windrim, director of the Department of Public Works. The bridge was designed as a double-decker bridge, but the upper deck was never built for lack of funds.

In 2007, blue LED lights were added to highlight the bridge at night.

See also

List of bridges documented by the Historic American Engineering Record in Pennsylvania
List of crossings of the Schuylkill River

References

External links

Article at "Workshop of the World"
Article at "The Necessity of Ruins"
Listing at Philadelphia Architects and Buildings
Listing at BridgeHunter.com

Bridges over the Schuylkill River
Bridges completed in 1895
Bridges in Philadelphia
Road bridges in Pennsylvania
Historic American Engineering Record in Philadelphia
Steel bridges in the United States
Pratt truss bridges in the United States